Ronaldo Soares Giovanelli (born 20 November 1967) is a Brazilian football pundit and retired footballer. Although as a child he was a forward, he spent his career as a goalkeeper.

Club career

Ronaldo begun his career in 1979, after making the cut during a Corinthians youth tryout. Originally a forward, he was intimidated by the large pool of children who were gunning for attacking positions that day and decided to try out for a goalkeeping position, as he had brought gloves to the try out. Earning a spot as a third goalkeeper with the junior team, Ronaldo was eventually brought to the main team to help out in training. He made his professional debut in a goalless friendly against São José EC in 1988. During that year's Campeonato Paulista he defended a penalty kick from Darío Pereyra in the derby against São Paulo FC, cementing his place as the starting goalkeeper for the team.

As a player, Ronaldo was notorious for his physicality and for not being afraid of charging an incoming attacker.

A fundamental player in the 1990 Corinthians' Campeonato Brasileiro title win, and in 1994's defeat in the finals against SE Palmeiras, Ronaldo earned the Bola de Plata award from Placar magazine for best goalkeeper in both of these years. He left the club in 1998, by the order of then coach Vanderlei Luxemburgo, who sought to "renew" the club after the near relegation in 1997. Ronaldo played 602 times for Corinthians, being the team's third most capped player.

After being released by Corinthians, he played for many other clubs with nowhere near the success he enjoyed with Corinthians. He was a part of the Fluminense squad that was relegated from Série B to Série C in 1998. He retired from professional football in 2005.

Music career

While still playing for Corinthians, Ronaldo was the lead singer of the band Ronaldo e os Impedidos ("Ronaldo and the Offsiders"). After releasing two records, the band broke up. They returned in 2010 for the Corinthians' 100th anniversary festivities, and have been active since, playing both original music and covering songs from bands such as Megadeth, and artists like Raul Seixas and Elvis Presley. Ronaldo is also a radio host for Kiss FM.

Personal life
Ronaldo is married and a father of two sons.

He suffers from alopecia areata, which caused him to lose most of his hair.

Honours

Club
Sport Club Corinthians Paulista
 Campeonato Paulista: 1988, 1995, 1997
 Campeonato Brasileiro: 1990
 Supercopa do Brasil: 1991
 Copa do Brasil: 1995

Individual

Bola de Prata: 1990, 1994

References

External links

1967 births
Living people
Brazilian footballers
Brazil international footballers
Brazil under-20 international footballers
Association football goalkeepers
Campeonato Brasileiro Série A players
Sport Club Corinthians Paulista players
Associação Portuguesa de Desportos players
Fluminense FC players
Associação Atlética Internacional (Limeira) players
Associação Atlética Ponte Preta players
Cruzeiro Esporte Clube players
Sociedade Esportiva do Gama players
ABC Futebol Clube players
Footballers from São Paulo